Perry is a surname with several distinct origins. In England, deriving from the Old English  (pear tree), referring to one who dwells by a pear tree, while in Wales Perry, along with Parry, arose as patronymics, via a shortening of "ap Harry" (son of Harry). There are some variants in the Romance languages (derived from Latin): Pereira, Pereyra, Pereyro, Pereiro, Pereiros, Pereire, Perera, Perer, Perero, Pereros; the Norman French  (quarry), possibly referring to a quarryman. Perry was recorded as a surname from the late 16th century in villages near Colchester, Essex, East England, such as Lexden and Copford. Perry has some resemblance with the Portuguese common surname Pereira, which means pear tree in the Portuguese language. Because of that, many Portuguese immigrants to the USA (especially Massachusetts and the San Francisco Bay Area) chose to "Americanize" their Pereira surname to Perry. The Italian surname, Perri, related to "Peter", is also often Americanized to Perry.

Geographical distribution

United Kingdom, Empire, and Dependencies
At the time of the United Kingdom Census of 1881, the frequency of the surname Perry was highest in the following counties:

 1. Somerset (1: 312)
 2. Essex (1: 347)
 3. Staffordshire (1: 396)
 4. Rutland (1: 405)
 5. Worcestershire (1: 458)
 6. Hertfordshire (1: 576)
 7. Bedfordshire (1: 676)
 8. Shropshire (1: 698)
 9. Cornwall (1: 699)
 10. Devon (1: 746)

As of 2014, the frequency of the surname was highest in the following countries and territories:

 1. Guernsey (1: 1,147)
 2. French Polynesia (1: 1,231)
 3. Wales (1: 1,277)
 4. United States (1: 1,332)
 5. Bermuda (1: 1,367)
 6. Jamaica (1: 1,538)
 7. Isle of Man (1: 1,564)
 8. Israel (1: 1,572)
 9. New Zealand (1: 1,588)
 10. Liberia (1: 1,597)

United States and Territories
As of 2014, 67.0% of all known bearers of the surname Perry were residents of the United States. The frequency of the surname was higher than national average in the following U.S. states:

 1. Rhode Island (1: 563)
 2. Maine (1: 652)
 3. Vermont (1: 658)
 4. West Virginia (1: 660)
 5. North Carolina (1: 699)
 6. Tennessee (1: 715)
 7. Kentucky (1: 797)
 8. Massachusetts (1: 801)
 9. New Hampshire (1: 828)
 10. Alabama (1: 857)
 11. Mississippi (1: 961)
 12. South Carolina (1: 1,003)
 13. Arkansas (1: 1,025)
 14. Virginia (1: 1,040)
 15. Louisiana (1: 1,076)
 16. Oklahoma (1: 1,081)
 17. Utah (1: 1,107)
 18. D.C. (1: 1,116)
 19. Georgia (1: 1,153)
 20. Indiana (1: 1,169)
 21. Ohio (1: 1,190)
 22. Michigan (1: 1,215)
 23. Connecticut (1: 1,235)
 24. Maryland (1: 1,243)
 25. Idaho (1: 1,302)
 26. Alabama (1: 1,321)

The frequency of the surname was highest (over 10 times the national average) in the following U.S. counties:

 1. McCreary County, Ky. (1: 49)
 2. Slope County, N.D. (1: 59)
 3. Bertie County, N.C. (1: 61)
 4. Franklin County, N.C. (1: 88)
 5. Chowan County, N.C. (1: 102)
 6. Daggett County, Utah (1: 105)
 7. Warren County, N.C. (1: 106)
 8. Morgan County, Ky. (1: 112)
 9. Wheatland County, Mont. (1: 112)
 10. Vance County, N.C. (1: 115)
 11. Wolfe County, Ky. (1: 119)
 12. Nash County, N.C. (1: 124)
 13. Hertford County, N.C. (1: 129)
 14. Brown County, Ill. (1: 129)
 15. Washington County, Colo. (1: 130)

People

Adam Perry (disambiguation), multiple people
Adam Perry (drummer) (born 1969), known professionally as "The Yin", member of the bands A and Bloodhound Gang
Adam Perry (rugby league) (born 1979), Australian rugby player
Alf Perry, English golfer
Alfred Perry, co-founder of the Douglas Hospital in Montreal, Quebec, Canada
 Andre Perry, member of the American rock band The Lonelyhearts
Andrew Perry (disambiguation), multiple people
Anne Perry (born 1938), English author
Antoinette Perry (1888–1946), American actress and director; founder American Theatre Wing, annual Antoinette Perry Awards, Tony Awards
Arlis Perry (1955–1974), American female murder victim
Aulcie Perry (born 1950), retired American-Israeli professional basketball player
Aylesworth Perry (1860–1956), the sixth and longest-serving Commissioner of the Royal Canadian Mounted Police
Barbara Perry (1923–2019), also singer and dancer
Bob J. Perry (1932–2013), American homebuilder and major political contributor
Bonnie Perry, American Anglican bishop in Michigan
Bradley Steven Perry, American actor known for playing Gabe Duncan on the Disney Channel Original Series Good Luck Charlie
Brianna Perry, American female rapper
Caitríona Perry (born 1980), Irish television journalist and newsreader
Carlotta Perry (1839/48 – 1914), American writer, poet
Catherine D. Perry (born 1952) U.S. judge
 Catherine Joy Perry (born 1985), professional name Lana, American model and professional wrestling figure (valet and wrestler)
Charles Perry (Texas politician) (born 1962), CPA and Texas state legislator
Charlie Perry (footballer, born 1866) (died 1927), English
Charlie Perry (Australian rules footballer) (1888–1961), also Methodist minister and son of Isaiah Perry
Charles O. Perry (1929-2011), American Sculptor
Chris Perry (disambiguation), multiple people
Clark M. Perry (1872–1936), American politician
Corey Perry (born 1985), Canadian hockey player
Darren Perry (born 1968), American football player and NFL coach 
Dave Perry, English game show co-commentator
David Perry (disambiguation), multiple people
Dayn Perry (born 1972), American sportswriter
Dewayne E. Perry, American engineer
Edmund Perry, 1985 murder victim
Edmund Perry (New Jersey politician) (1825–1878), American politician
Edward Perry (industrialist) (1800–1869), English tinplate works master and twice Mayor of Wolverhampton
Edward A. Perry, governor of Florida
E. J. Perry (American football) (born 1998), American football player
Eleanor Perry (née Rosenfeld, 1914 – 1981), screenwriter and author
Elliott Perry (1884–1972), American philatelist
Ellyse Perry, Australian cricketer and footballer
Elwood L. Perry (1915–2005), American expert on freshwater fishing
Enoch Wood Perry, Jr. (1831–1915), American artist
Frank Perry (1930–1995), American film director
Fred Perry (disambiguation), multiple people
Fred Perry (1909–1995), British tennis player
Gaylord Perry (1938–2022), American baseball player
Geoffrey Perry (1927–2000), English physics teacher and amateur astronomer
George Perry (disambiguation), multiple people
George Sessions Perry (1910–1956), American novelist
Glenn Perry, Australian writer
Grayson Perry, English artist
Guy Perry, American actor
Hal Perry (basketball) (1933–2009), American
Hal Perry (politician), Canadian
Isaiah Perry (1854–1911), Methodist minister is South Australia, father of engineer Frank Perry and footballer Charlie Perry
Ivor Perry (1904-?), Welsh footballer
 Jack Perry (born 1997), American professional wrestler also known as Jungle Boy; son of Luke Perry
James Perry (disambiguation), multiple people
Jason Perry (disambiguation), multiple people
Jeff Perry (American actor) (born 1955)
Jim Perry (baseball) (born 1935), from America; brother of Gaylord Perry
Jim Perry (television personality), Canadian-American television personality (stage name)
Jimmy Perry (1923–2016), English scriptwriter
Joe Perry (American football) (1927–2011), American footballer
Joe Perry (musician) (born 1950), American guitarist of the rock band Aerosmith (Americanized form of Pereira)
Joe Perry (snooker player) (born 1974), from England
John Perry (musician) (born 1952), English guitarist and writer
John Bennett Perry (born 1973), American actor and former model
Jonathan Perry (disambiguation), multiple people
Jonathan Perry (Louisiana politician) (born 1973), attorney and state legislator
Josephine Perry (1881–1943), American politician
Juan Perry, Peruvian congressman
Katherine Perry (1897–1983), American stage and film actress.
Katie Perry (born 1980), Australian fashion designer
Katy Perry (born 1984), originally named Katheryn Elizabeth Hudson, American pop singer
Kenny Perry (born 1960), American golfer
 Kimberly Perry (born 1983), American musician, lead vocalist of The Band Perry
Kyle Perry (born 1986), English footballer
L. Glenn Perry (1944–1998), Chief Accountant of the SEC
L. Tom Perry (1922–2015), an Apostle in The Church of Jesus Christ of Latter-day Saints
Lee "Scratch" Perry (1936–2021), Jamaican reggae producer
 Lincoln Perry, birth name of Stepin Fetchit (1902–1985), American comedian and actor
Linda Perry, American singer, songwriter and record producer (Americanized form of Pereira)
Lorinda Perry (1884–1951), American economist, professor, lawyer
Luke Perry (1966–2019), American actor
Madison S. Perry, governor of Florida
Malcolm Perry (disambiguation), multiple people
Mark Perry (disambiguation), multiple people
Mario Perry, American football player
Mary Perry Smith (1926–2015), American mathematics educator
Matthew Perry (disambiguation), multiple people
Matthew Perry (born 1969), Canadian-American television and film actor
Matthew C. Perry (1794–1858), American naval officer
Matt Perry (rugby player) (born 1977), English rugby union footballer
Michael Perry (disambiguation), multiple people
Michael Perry (hymnwriter) (1942–1996), English hymnwriter
Michael Perry (footballer) (born 1944), Australian rules
 Neil Perry, American musician, member of The Band Perry
Nora Perry (writer) (1831–1896), American poet, journalist
Niamh Perry (born 1990), Northern Irish singer
N'Kosi Perry (born 1998), American football player
Oliver Hazard Perry (1785–1819), American naval officer
Oliver Henry Perry (1815–1882), American politician
Paul Perry (disambiguation), several people
Pete Perry (basketball) (born 1948), American
Pete Perry (activist) (born 1969), American activist
Phil Perry (born 1957), musician
Philippa Perry (born 1957), English psychotherapist and author
Ralph Barton Perry (1876–1957), American philosopher and educator
 Reid Perry, American musician, member of The Band Perry
Reggie Perry (basketball) (born 2000), American basketball player
Rick Perry (born 1950), U.S. Secretary of Energy (2017–2019)
Robert H Perry, yacht designer
Roderick Perry II (born 1997), American football player
Roger Perry (1933 – 2018), American film and television actor 
Roland Hinton Perry, American artist
Ross Perry, Scottish footballer
S. D. Perry (born 1970), American novelist
Samuel Augustus Perry (1787–1854) English born soldier and surveyor.
Samuel Marshall Perry (1836–1898), Los Angeles city councilman and county supervisor
Samuel Victor Perry (1918–2009), British biochemist and rugby player
Scott Perry (disambiguation), multiple people
Seamus Perry (born 1967), British academic and writer 
Shane Perry (born 1977), Australian rugby league player
Shaun Perry (born 1978), Bristol and England rugby union player
Shenay Perry (born 1984), American tennis player
Steve Perry (disambiguation), multiple people
Steve Perry, lead singer of the American rock band Journey (Americanized form of Pereira)
Steve Perry (author)
Stephen Perry (inventor), British inventor of the rubber band
Steve Perry (Oregon musician), from the band Cherry Poppin' Daddies
Stephen Joseph Perry (1833–1889), Jesuit priest, astronomer
Suzi Perry (born 1970), English television presenter
Todd Perry (American football) (born 1970), NFL player
Todd Perry (ice hockey) (born 1986), Canadian
Todd Perry (tennis) (born 1976), Australian
Tyler Perry (born 1969), American actor, playwright, and director
Roni Jones-Perry (born 1997), American volleyball player
Walter Perry (1921–2003), Scottish academic and scientist, VC of the Open University 
Walter Perry (1868–1928), English footballer, mostly for Burton Swifts
Walter Copland Perry (1814–1911), British author, classicist and barrister 
Whitall Perry (1920–2005), American writer
William Perry (disambiguation), multiple people

See also 
 Perry (given name)
 Perry (disambiguation)
 Pereira (surname)
 Perri (disambiguation)

References

Americanized surnames
English-language surnames
Surnames of English origin